The Troféu Brasil de Atletismo (Brazil Athletics Trophy) is an annual track and field meeting which serves as Brazil's national championships for the sport for athletics clubs. The Brazilian Athletics Confederation has not explicitly designated an annual national championships, thus this also serves as the de facto senior athletics championships. It has also been used to determine the track and field team for Brazil at the Olympics.

The location and timing of the event varies, with the major cities of Rio de Janeiro and São Paulo frequently serving as host.

First held in 1945, the competition became Brazil's foremost track and field competition after the mid-1980s. The biennial Campeonato Brasileiro de Seleções Estaduais had previously been treated as the national championship event in the period from 1929 to 1985. The Troféu Brasil de Atletismo has not been held consistently since its inauguration and reached its thirtieth edition in 2011.

Championships records

Men

References

Athletics competitions in Brazil
National athletics competitions
Recurring sporting events established in 1945
1945 establishments in Brazil
 
Athletics